Waldheim may refer to:

Places 
 Waldheim, Saskatchewan, a town in Saskatchewan, Canada
 Waldheim, Saxony, a town in Saxony, Germany
 Waldheim (Hanover), a suburban district of Hanover, Germany
 Waldheim (Umm al 'Amad) or Alonei Abba, an Evangelical settlement of 1907 in northern Israel
 Valdgeym, or Waldheim, a rural locality in the Jewish Autonomous Oblast, Russia
 Waldheim, the home of Gustav Weindorfer which was instrumental in establishing Cradle Mountain National Park in Tasmania, Australia
 Waldheim, the country home of James Speyer, an American banker

People with the surname 
 Gotthelf Fischer von Waldheim (1771–1853), German-Russian zoologist, anatomist, entomologist and paleontologist
 Alexandr Alexandrovich Fischer von Waldheim (1839–1920), Russian botanist, grandson of the above
 Elisabeth Waldheim (1922–2017), Kurt Waldheim's widow and a former first lady of Austria
 Kurt Waldheim (1918–2007), President of Austria and Secretary-General of the UN
 Donald Walheim (born 1939), American professional heavyweight boxer
 Zanis Waldheims (1909–1993), Latvian painter

See also 
 German Waldheim Cemetery